Spanghero is a French surname. Notable people with the surname include:

Claude Spanghero (born 1948), French rugby union footballer
Nicolas Spanghero (born 1976), French rugby union footballer
Walter Spanghero (born 1943), French rugby union footballer

French-language surnames